The Museum Ethnographers Group (MEG) is a United Kingdom-based collective for those working with and researching ethnographic collections in museums. It is registered as a charity in England and Wales (no. 1023150) and is recognised in the UK museum sector as a subject specialist network. It is often known to its members by its acronym MEG. Its most obvious functions are the annual conference it organises and the journal it publishes.

History 
MEG was founded in 1975 at a meeting in Liverpool on Communicating Anthropology — the role of museums, when its first Chair was Peter Gathercole.

MEG conference 
MEG holds an annual conference, normally hosted by a UK museum. MEG's 2018 conference at the Pitt Rivers Museum concerned the legacy of colonialism in British museums.

Journal of Museum Ethnography 
The MEG newsletter for many years functioned as a kind of journal, containing scholarly articles despite its photocopied pages. In 1989, MEG began to publish the Journal of Museum Ethnography (JME), and has done so every year since. In 2010, MEG reached an agreement with JSTOR to digitise all past issues of JME, as well as the early newsletters.

Issues and themes

References

External links 
 MEG website
 MEG blog on Blogspot

Organizations established in 1975
Museum organizations
Ethnography
Charities based in Norfolk
1975 establishments in the United Kingdom